Amphitheatre Glacier is a moraine-covered glacier that flows north from The Amphitheatre into Roaring Valley, in the Royal Society Range of Antarctica. It was named by a New Zealand Geographical Society field party in the area, 1977–78, in association with The Amphitheatre.

See also
 List of glaciers in the Antarctic
 Glaciology

References
 

Glaciers of Scott Coast